"Ederlezi" is a popular traditional folk song of the Romani people in the Balkans.

The song got its name from Ederlezi, which is a festival celebrating the return of springtime, especially by the Romani people of the Balkans, and elsewhere around the world. Ederlezi is the Romani name for the Feast of Saint George. The various Balkan spellings (Herdeljez, Erdelezi) are variants of the Turkish Hıdırellez.

Versions

The song is featured on Bijelo Dugme's 1988 album Ćiribiribela under the title "Đurđevdan" ("St. George's Day"). Goran Bregović, the frontman of Bijelo Dugme, wrote the Serbo-Croatian lyrics.Bregović also recorded a version with Greek lyrics, titled "Του Αη Γιώργη" ("Tou Ai Giorgi", "Saint George's"), with Greek singer Alkistis Protopsalti in 1991. The Greek lyrics are credited to Lina Nikolakopoulou. Bregović also worked with Turkish singer Sezen Aksu on her album titled Düğün ve Cenaze (A Wedding and a Funeral) featuring a version with Turkish lyrics, titled ("Hıdrellez") in 1997. The lyrics were adapted by Aksu and Pakize Barışta. Finally, together with Polish singer Kayah he also recorded a version with Polish lyrics, titled "Nie ma, nie ma ciebie".

Bulgarian group Ku-Ku Band, with lead singer Slavi Trifonov, released the song on several albums with Bulgarian lyrics, titled "Гергьовден" ("Gergyovden", "St. George's Day"); Serbo-Bulgarian lyrics, titled "Свети Георги" ("Sveti Georgi", "St. George"); and Romani-Serbo-Bulgarian lyrics, titled "Erdelezi". The band Beirut, Italian saxophonist Daniele Sepe, and the Boston-based band Bury Me Standing also do covers of "Ederlezi". The Gypsy Rebels of Toronto, Ontario also cover the song, featuring the vocals of Micheal T. Butch and his band. Kroke released a version of the song as well.

A Bosnian version was released by the folk-punk musical group No Smoking Orchestra on their 2007 album Time of the Gypsies, Punk Opera.
A beatbox/trip version was released by French band "Plume Tribu" on their 2010 album Le Chainon Manquant.

In popular culture
Goran Bregović's version titled "Ederlezi (Scena Djurdjevdana Na Rijeci)" was famously used in Emir Kusturica's movie Time of the Gypsies. It was performed by the Macedonian singer Vaska Jankovska.

"Ederlezi (Scena Djurdjevdana Na Rijeci)" also appeared in the movie Borat, although it has no connection to the authentic music of Kazakhstan. The text in brackets in Serbo-Croatian means: "The scene of Đurđevdan on the river", a description of a Đurđevdan celebration on a river in the movie Time of the Gypsies where that song was used. Sacha Baron Cohen's movie does not have a Đurđevdan river scene. In both soundtrack albums – Time of the Gypsies and Stereophonic Musical Listenings That Have Been Origin in Moving Film "Borat: Cultural Learnings of America for Make Benefit Glorious Nation of Kazakhstan" – it was credited to Goran Bregović, although he is not the author nor the singer of the song on these albums. However, he arranged the song.

A.I. Rising (2018), a Serbian science fiction film, was originally entitled Ederlezi Rising.

A portion of "Ederlezi (Scena Djurdjevdana Na Rijeci)" was also featured in Lazy Square's (or Lenivko Kvadratjić) unofficial "Russian art film" reimagining of The Simpsons popular opening sequence "couch gag".

Lyrics

See also
Romani music

References

Literature

External links
 Musique et droit d’auteur, l’affaire Bregović - Julien Radenez, Le Courrier des Balkans, 05/09/2015

Ederlezi, retour aux sources - Julien Radenez, Le Courrier des Balkans, 01/01/2022
  Videos: Ederlezi song (3:43); (4:28); (4:22).

Romani music
1988 songs
1988 singles